Misha, also known as Mishka or The Olympic Mishka, is the name of the Russian Bear mascot of the 1980 Moscow Olympic Games (the XXII Summer Olympics). He was designed by children's books illustrator Victor Chizhikov.

Misha is the first mascot of a sporting event to achieve large-scale commercial success in merchandise. The Misha doll was used extensively during the opening and closing ceremonies, appeared on several merchandise products and had both an animated short film (animated by Soyuzmultfilm) and a television series (animated by Nippon Animation), all of which are now common practice not only in the Olympic Games, but also in the FIFA World Cup and other events' mascots.

Origins of the name Misha 

In Russian, Misha is a short form for the Russian male name Mikhail (Michael), and Mishka is a diminutive of Misha.

This name, in any of its forms, is a common colloquialism in Russian for a bear, because it is similar to the standard name for 'bear,' медведь (medved'). Also, most anthropomorphic bears in Russian fairy tales have this name. It is thought to originate as a euphemism for medved', which was tabooed because of magical thinking that letting out the "true name" of the dangerous animal may cause it to come and attack. Medved''' (which means "honey-eater") itself is thought to be older Proto-Slavic euphemism for Proto-Indo-European *r̥kþos.

 Origins 
In 1977, the committee organizing the Olympics held a contest for the best illustration of a bear. The judges chose Victor Chizhikov's design depicting a smiling bear cub wearing a blue-black-yellow-green-red (colors of the Olympic rings) weightlifter's belt, with a golden buckle shaped like the five rings. Misha's design of a small, cuddly and smiling bear cub was evidently intended to counter the "big and brutal Russian Bear". Misha was confirmed as an official mascot on 19 December 1977. Chizhikov complained that the country reneged on a promise to grant him the copyright to his bear which deprived him of royalties, although the Russian Olympic Committee stated "in accordance with the Olympic Charter, after Dec. 31 of the year in which the Olympic Games had been held, all the rights to the intellectual property and the symbols of the Olympics go the International Olympic Committee".

Misha's origins were depicted in the 1979 animated film Baba Yaga is against!During the closing ceremony of the 1980 Olympic Games, a giant effigy of Misha the Bear holding a cluster of balloons was paraded in the stadium. On one side of the stadium where the Olympic Torch was situated, there was a placard mural of Misha which shed tears of happiness from his left eye. At the end of the ceremony, Misha with his balloons was released and rose in the air away from the stadium, and this nostalgic moment has been fondly remembered by Russians. A few hours later Misha landed on Vorobyovy Gory and later was exhibited at the Exhibition Centre.

 Legacy 
Misha also appeared in the 1980 Olympics episode of the Soviet cartoon Nu, pogodi!, handing trophies to the Wolf and the Hare.

In 1988, in connection with the 60th anniversary of Mickey Mouse, a special magazine was produced in which Mickey Mouse and Misha met.

Misha's designer, Viktor Chizhikov, accused the designer of the polar bear mascot (named Bely Mishka, and is said to be Misha's grandson) for the 2014 Sochi Olympics of plagiarism. Chizhikov noted that the Bely's facial features were all taken from Misha, saying "they just pumped him up and made him fatter". Chizhikov also complained that Bely and the other two mascots (the Hare and Leopard) was lacking personality. As a result of these issues, as well as being denied the copyright to Misha, Chizhikov declined to help when asked by the organizers of the 2014 Winter Olympics closing ceremony.

A short clip of the 1980 Summer Olympics closing ceremony of Misha's departure was shown in the closing ceremony of the 2014 Winter Olympics, afterward the giant animatronic polar bear Mishka blew out the 2014 Games Olympic torch and sheds a tear (in a nod to Misha's tears during the end of the 1980 Games).Cooper, Sam. (23 February 2014) Sochi Bear mascot 'blows out' Olympic flame to cap off a great Olympics for bears | Fourth-Place Medal – Yahoo Sports. Sports.yahoo.com. Retrieved on 2016-07-02.

The main character of the manga series Uchi no Maid ga Uzasugiru is named after Misha.

In the 2017 film Salyut-7, a plush toy of Misha is used as a Zero-G indicator by the cosmonauts.

Misha the Little Bear

, is an anime television series produced by Nippon Animation and Asahi Broadcasting Corporation and directed by Yoshikata Nitta. It aired in Japan on TV Asahi from 6 October 1979 to 5 April 1980, running for 26 episodes. It reran on Home Drama Channel in 1999, and again in 2009 on AT-X. Though it has never been released on DVD, it is available on various paid video distribution services in Japan.

The series was inspired by the mascot introduced for the 1980 Summer Olympics held in Moscow. Character designer Isamu Kumada based the design for Misha on Chizhikov's illustrations. The opening and ending animations were unfinished at the time of the first episode's broadcast, and the onscreen lyrics for the songs were also omitted. From episode 2 onwards, the main staff and theme song credits were marked in blue, and finished versions were used, which also displayed the lyrics. At the end of the opening, the 1980 Olympics emblem logo was added with text indicating that the characters were being used with the consent of the Organizing Committee for the Olympic Games in Moscow.

 See also 

 Olympic mascot
 Russian Bear
 Brown bear
 Teddy bear

 References 

 External links 

 
 Anime series outline by Nippon Animation
 Moscow Olympics' site, includes the Misha farewell song До свиданья, Москва''
 Translation of the Misha song to English at the China Daily website
 Olympics Logos and Mascots: Official image of Misha

1979 anime television series debuts
1980 Summer Olympics
Bear mascots
Fictional bears
Olympic mascots
Soviet culture
Russian mascots